Francium is a chemical element with the symbol Fr and atomic number 87. It is extremely radioactive; its most stable isotope, francium-223 (originally called actinium K after the natural decay chain in which it appears), has a half-life of only 22 minutes. It is the second-most electropositive element, behind only caesium, and is the second rarest naturally occurring element (after astatine). The isotopes of francium decay quickly into astatine, radium, and radon. The electronic structure of a francium atom is [Rn] 7s1, and so the element is classed as an alkali metal.

Bulk francium has never been seen. Because of the general appearance of the other elements in its periodic table column, it is presumed that francium would appear as a highly reactive metal, if enough could be collected together to be viewed as a bulk solid or liquid. Obtaining such a sample is highly improbable, since the extreme heat of decay resulting from its short half-life would immediately vaporize any viewable quantity of the element.

Francium was discovered by Marguerite Perey in France (from which the element takes its name) in 1939. Prior to its discovery, it was referred to as eka-caesium or ekacaesium because of its conjectured existence below caesium in the periodic table. It was the last element first discovered in nature, rather than by synthesis. Outside the laboratory, francium is extremely rare, with trace amounts found in uranium ores, where the isotope francium-223 (in the family of uranium-235) continually forms and decays. As little as 200–500 g exists at any given time throughout the Earth's crust; aside from francium-223 and francium-221, its other isotopes are entirely synthetic. The largest amount produced in the laboratory was a cluster of more than 300,000 atoms.

Characteristics
Francium is one of the most unstable of the naturally occurring elements: its longest-lived isotope, francium-223, has a half-life of only 22 minutes. The only comparable element is astatine, whose most stable natural isotope, astatine-219 (the alpha daughter of francium-223), has a half-life of 56 seconds, although synthetic astatine-210 is much longer-lived with a half-life of 8.1 hours. All isotopes of francium decay into astatine, radium, or radon. Francium-223 also has a shorter half-life than the longest-lived isotope of each synthetic element up to and including element 105, dubnium.

Francium is an alkali metal whose chemical properties mostly resemble those of caesium. A heavy element with a single valence electron, it has the highest equivalent weight of any element. Liquid francium—if created—should have a surface tension of 0.05092 N/m at its melting point. The melting point is uncertain because of the element's extreme rarity and radioactivity; a different extrapolation based on Dmitri Mendeleev's method gave . The density of francium is expected to be around 2.48 g/cm3 (Mendeleev's method extrapolates 2.4 g/cm3).

Linus Pauling estimated the electronegativity of francium at 0.7 on the Pauling scale, the same as caesium; the value for caesium has since been refined to 0.79, but there are no experimental data to allow a refinement of the value for francium. Francium has a slightly higher ionization energy than caesium, 392.811(4) kJ/mol as opposed to 375.7041(2) kJ/mol for caesium, as would be expected from relativistic effects, and this would imply that caesium is the less electronegative of the two. Francium should also have a higher electron affinity than caesium and the Fr− ion should be more polarizable than the Cs− ion.

Compounds
Due to francium being very unstable, its salts are only known to a small extent. Francium coprecipitates with several caesium salts, such as caesium perchlorate, which results in small amounts of francium perchlorate. This coprecipitation can be used to isolate francium, by adapting the radiocaesium coprecipitation method of Lawrence E. Glendenin and C. M. Nelson. It will additionally coprecipitate with many other caesium salts, including the iodate, the picrate, the tartrate (also rubidium tartrate), the chloroplatinate, and the silicotungstate. It also coprecipitates with silicotungstic acid, and with perchloric acid, without another alkali metal as a carrier, which leads to other methods of separation.

Francium perchlorate
Francium perchlorate is produced by the reaction of francium chloride and sodium perchlorate. The francium perchlorate coprecipitates with caesium perchlorate. This coprecipitation can be used to isolate francium, by adapting the radiocaesium coprecipitation method of Lawrence E. Glendenin and C. M. Nelson. However, this method is unreliable in separating thallium, which also coprecipitates with caesium. Francium perchlorate's entropy is expected to be 42.7 e.u (178.7 J mol−1 K−1).

Francium halides
Francium halides are all soluble in water and are expected to be white solids. They are expected to be produced by the reaction of the corresponding halogens. For example, francium chloride would be produced by the reaction of francium and chlorine. Francium chloride has been studied as a pathway to separate francium from other elements, by using the high vapour pressure of the compound, although francium fluoride would have a higher vapour pressure.

Other compounds
Francium nitrate, sulfate, hydroxide, carbonate, acetate, and oxalate, are all soluble in water, while the iodate, picrate, tartrate, chloroplatinate, and silicotungstate are insoluble. The insolubility of these compounds are used to extract francium from other radioactive products, such as zirconium, niobium, molybdenum, tin, antimony, the method mentioned in the section above. The CsFr molecule is predicted to have francium at the negative end of the dipole, unlike all known heterodiatomic alkali metal molecules. Francium superoxide (FrO2) is expected to have a more covalent character than its lighter congeners; this is attributed to the 6p electrons in francium being more involved in the francium–oxygen bonding. The relativistic destabilisation of the 6p3/2 spinor may make francium compounds in oxidation states higher than +1 possible, such as [FrVF6]−; but this has not been experimentally confirmed.

The only double salt known of francium has the formula Fr9Bi2I9.

Isotopes

There are 34 known isotopes of francium ranging in atomic mass from 199 to 232. Francium has seven metastable nuclear isomers. Francium-223 and francium-221 are the only isotopes that occur in nature, with the former being far more common.

Francium-223 is the most stable isotope, with a half-life of 21.8 minutes, and it is highly unlikely that an isotope of francium with a longer half-life will ever be discovered or synthesized. Francium-223 is a fifth product of the uranium-235 decay series as a daughter isotope of actinium-227; thorium-227 is the more common daughter. Francium-223 then decays into radium-223 by beta decay (1.149 MeV decay energy), with a minor (0.006%) alpha decay path to astatine-219 (5.4 MeV decay energy).

Francium-221 has a half-life of 4.8 minutes. It is the ninth product of the neptunium decay series as a daughter isotope of actinium-225. Francium-221 then decays into astatine-217 by alpha decay (6.457 MeV decay energy). Although all primordial 237Np is extinct, the neptunium decay series continues to exist naturally in tiny traces due to (n,2n) knockout reactions in natural 238U.

The least stable ground state isotope is francium-215, with a half-life of 0.12 μs: it undergoes a 9.54 MeV alpha decay to astatine-211. Its metastable isomer, francium-215m, is less stable still, with a half-life of only 3.5 ns.

Applications
Due to its instability and rarity, there are no commercial applications for francium. It has been used for research purposes in the fields of chemistry
and of atomic structure. Its use as a potential diagnostic aid for various cancers has also been explored, but this application has been deemed impractical.

Francium's ability to be synthesized, trapped, and cooled, along with its relatively simple atomic structure, has made it the subject of specialized spectroscopy experiments. These experiments have led to more specific information regarding energy levels and the coupling constants between subatomic particles. Studies on the light emitted by laser-trapped francium-210 ions have provided accurate data on transitions between atomic energy levels which are fairly similar to those predicted by quantum theory.

History
As early as 1870, chemists thought that there should be an alkali metal beyond caesium, with an atomic number of 87. It was then referred to by the provisional name eka-caesium. Research teams attempted to locate and isolate this missing element, and at least four false claims were made that the element had been found before an authentic discovery was made.

Erroneous and incomplete discoveries
In 1914, Stefan Meyer, Viktor F. Hess, and Friedrich Paneth (working in Vienna) made measurements of alpha radiation from various substances, including 227Ac. They observed the possibility of a minor alpha branch of this nuclide, though follow-up work could not be done due to the outbreak of World War I. Their observations were not precise and sure enough for them to announce the discovery of element 87, though it is likely that they did indeed observe the decay of 227Ac to 223Fr.

Soviet chemist Dmitry Dobroserdov was the first scientist to claim to have found eka-caesium, or francium. In 1925, he observed weak radioactivity in a sample of potassium, another alkali metal, and incorrectly concluded that eka-caesium was contaminating the sample (the radioactivity from the sample was from the naturally occurring potassium radioisotope, potassium-40). He then published a thesis on his predictions of the properties of eka-caesium, in which he named the element russium after his home country. Shortly thereafter, Dobroserdov began to focus on his teaching career at the Polytechnic Institute of Odessa, and he did not pursue the element further.

The following year, English chemists Gerald J. F. Druce and Frederick H. Loring analyzed X-ray photographs of manganese(II) sulfate. They observed spectral lines which they presumed to be of eka-caesium. They announced their discovery of element 87 and proposed the name alkalinium, as it would be the heaviest alkali metal.

In 1930, Fred Allison of the Alabama Polytechnic Institute claimed to have discovered element 87 (in addition to 85) when analyzing pollucite and lepidolite using his magneto-optical machine. Allison requested that it be named virginium after his home state of Virginia, along with the symbols Vi and Vm. In 1934, H.G. MacPherson of UC Berkeley disproved the effectiveness of Allison's device and the validity of his discovery.

In 1936, Romanian physicist Horia Hulubei and his French colleague Yvette Cauchois also analyzed pollucite, this time using their high-resolution X-ray apparatus. They observed several weak emission lines, which they presumed to be those of element 87. Hulubei and Cauchois reported their discovery and proposed the name moldavium, along with the symbol Ml, after Moldavia, the Romanian province where Hulubei was born. In 1937, Hulubei's work was criticized by American physicist F. H. Hirsh Jr., who rejected Hulubei's research methods. Hirsh was certain that eka-caesium would not be found in nature, and that Hulubei had instead observed mercury or bismuth X-ray lines. Hulubei insisted that his X-ray apparatus and methods were too accurate to make such a mistake. Because of this, Jean Baptiste Perrin, Nobel Prize winner and Hulubei's mentor, endorsed moldavium as the true eka-caesium over Marguerite Perey's recently discovered francium. Perey took pains to be accurate and detailed in her criticism of Hulubei's work, and finally she was credited as the sole discoverer of element 87. All other previous purported discoveries of element 87 were ruled out due to francium's very limited half-life.

Perey's analysis
Eka-caesium was discovered on January 7, 1939, by Marguerite Perey of the Curie Institute in Paris, when she purified a sample of actinium-227 which had been reported to have a decay energy of 220 keV. Perey noticed decay particles with an energy level below 80 keV. Perey thought this decay activity might have been caused by a previously unidentified decay product, one which was separated during purification, but emerged again out of the pure actinium-227. Various tests eliminated the possibility of the unknown element being thorium, radium, lead, bismuth, or thallium. The new product exhibited chemical properties of an alkali metal (such as coprecipitating with caesium salts), which led Perey to believe that it was element 87, produced by the alpha decay of actinium-227. Perey then attempted to determine the proportion of beta decay to alpha decay in actinium-227. Her first test put the alpha branching at 0.6%, a figure which she later revised to 1%.

Perey named the new isotope actinium-K (it is now referred to as francium-223) and in 1946, she proposed the name catium (Cm) for her newly discovered element, as she believed it to be the most electropositive cation of the elements. Irène Joliot-Curie, one of Perey's supervisors, opposed the name due to its connotation of cat rather than cation; furthermore, the symbol coincided with that which had since been assigned to curium. Perey then suggested francium, after France. This name was officially adopted by the International Union of Pure and Applied Chemistry (IUPAC) in 1949, becoming the second element after gallium to be named after France. It was assigned the symbol Fa, but this abbreviation was revised to the current Fr shortly thereafter. Francium was the last element discovered in nature, rather than synthesized, following hafnium and rhenium. Further research into francium's structure was carried out by, among others, Sylvain Lieberman and his team at CERN in the 1970s and 1980s.

Occurrence

223Fr is the result of the alpha decay of 227Ac and can be found in trace amounts in uranium minerals. In a given sample of uranium, there is estimated to be only one francium atom for every 1 × 1018 uranium atoms. It is also calculated that there is a total mass of at most 30 g or, as other sources suggest, 340 to 550 g of francium in the Earth's crust at any given time.

Production

Francium can be synthesized by a fusion reaction when a gold-197 target is bombarded with a beam of oxygen-18 atoms from a linear accelerator in a process originally developed at the physics department of the State University of New York at Stony Brook in 1995. Depending on the energy of the oxygen beam, the reaction can yield francium isotopes with masses of 209, 210, and 211.

197Au + 18O → 209Fr + 6 n
197Au + 18O → 210Fr + 5 n
197Au + 18O → 211Fr + 4 n

The francium atoms leave the gold target as ions, which are neutralized by collision with yttrium and then isolated in a magneto-optical trap (MOT) in a gaseous unconsolidated state. Although the atoms only remain in the trap for about 30 seconds before escaping or undergoing nuclear decay, the process supplies a continual stream of fresh atoms. The result is a steady state containing a fairly constant number of atoms for a much longer time. The original apparatus could trap up to a few thousand atoms, while a later improved design could trap over 300,000 at a time. Sensitive measurements of the light emitted and absorbed by the trapped atoms provided the first experimental results on various transitions between atomic energy levels in francium. Initial measurements show very good agreement between experimental values and calculations based on quantum theory. The research project using this production method relocated to TRIUMF in 2012, where over 106 francium atoms have been held at a time, including large amounts of 209Fr in addition to 207Fr and 221Fr.

Other synthesis methods include bombarding radium with neutrons, and bombarding thorium with protons, deuterons, or helium ions.

223Fr can also be isolated from samples of its parent 227Ac, the francium being milked via elution with NH4Cl–CrO3 from an actinium-containing cation exchanger and purified by passing the solution through a silicon dioxide compound loaded with barium sulfate.

In 1996, the Stony Brook group trapped 3000 atoms in their MOT, which was enough for a video camera to capture the light given off by the atoms as they fluoresce. Francium has not been synthesized in amounts large enough to weigh.

Notes

References

External links 
 Francium at The Periodic Table of Videos (University of Nottingham)
 WebElements.com – Francium
 Stony Brook University Physics Dept.
 Scerri, Eric (2013). A Tale of Seven Elements, Oxford University Press, Oxford, 

 
Chemical elements
Alkali metals
Eponyms
Science and technology in France
Chemical elements with body-centered cubic structure
Chemical elements predicted by Dmitri Mendeleev